Macon Ernest "Mac" Sumner Jr. (March 27, 1940 – May 7, 2007) was an American politician who served in the Oregon House of Representatives from 2005 until 2006.

Early life
Sumner was born in Sedalia, Missouri in 1940 and moved to Oregon at the age of seven. He graduated from Benson Polytechnic High School. He was in the United States Air Force as a jet engine mechanic. He served in Japan and was discharged April 30, 1963.

Career
Sumner was appointed to the Molalla, Oregon City Council in October 1997 and elected in 1998, and served as mayor of the city from 2001 until 2002. He remained on the city council until the spring of 2004, when he resigned to run for the House. Sumner won in the crowded Republican primary and was elected, defeating Democrat Jim Gilbert. He was reelected in 2006, easily winning the primary and then the general election, once again defeating Gilbert.

Sumner was diagnosed with lung cancer in September 2006, and resigned on December 8. He was succeeded by Vic Gilliam, a part-time actor, educator, and political aide.

Sumner died on May 7, 2007, at the age of 67. Upon his death, Sumner was praised by then-Governor Ted Kulongoski.

Personal life
Sumner and his wife, Sandy, had seven children.

References

1940 births
2007 deaths
20th-century American politicians
21st-century American politicians
Benson Polytechnic High School alumni
Mayors of places in Oregon
Republican Party members of the Oregon House of Representatives
Oregon city council members
People from Sedalia, Missouri
People from Molalla, Oregon
United States Air Force airmen